Research has shown that Humulus lupulus (the plant that makes hops) and Cannabis sativa (also called hemp and marijuana) are closely related, and it may be possible to create novel strains of hops that express valuable chemicals similar to commercial hemp. Both hops and cannabis contain terpenes and terpenoids; tetrahydrocannabinol (THC) is a terpenoid. Hops lack the enzyme that could convert cannabigerolic acid into THC or CBD, but it could be inserted using genetic engineering as was done in 2019 for yeast.

Notes

See also

References

Sources

2019 in cannabis
Cannabinoids
Cannabinoids